The following highways are numbered 754:

Australia
 Melton Highway

Ireland
 R754 regional road

United States
 Georgia State Route 754 (former)
  County Route 754 (Cumberland County, New Jersey)
  Ohio State Route 754
  Puerto Rico Highway 754